IZ, Iz, or iZ may refer to:

 Arkia (IATA code: IZ), an Israeli airline
 Immobilien Zeitung, a weekly specialist journal for the German real estate industry
 Inclusionary zoning, an American term which refers to municipal and county planning ordinances
 International zone, a type of extraterritoriality governed by international law
 Invader Zim, an American animated television series
 Iraq (NATO country code: IZ), a country in Western Asia
 IZ (YouTuber), a Mongolian YouTuber
 Israel Kamakawiwoʻole (also called "Bruddah Iz"; 1959–1997), Hawaiian musician, entertainer and Hawaiian sovereignty activist
 IZ (band), a Korean rock band
 Iž, an island in the Zadar Archipelago
 iZ (toy), an electronic musical toy released EmpiresBritish

See also
1Z (disambiguation)